Gerald Ernest Moore (1926 – March 2018) was a British oral surgeon and child actor.

He was educated at Eltham College.

He bought Heathfield Park in 1963, where he established a riding school, wildlife park and a motor museum. He sold the estate in 1993.

In the mid-1960s he co-founded the Cavendish Bio Medical Centre.

Moore was also an artist, whose work was exhibited from the 1950s onwards. In 2012 he established the Gerald Moore Gallery at Eltham College, which exhibits his and others' work.

Family

With his first wife Irene, Moore had three sons, Julian, Adrian and Lucien. After Irene's death he married Ruth.

Filmography

 Went the Day Well? (1942)

Books

 The Singing Dust (1976, with Odette Tchernine)
 Treading in Treacle (1983)

References

External links
 Gerald Moore Gallery
 Internet Movie Database

1926 births
2018 deaths
People educated at Eltham College
British surgeons
British child actors
20th-century British artists